The economy of Australia is one of the most developed, modern market economies in the world and the most productive in South Pacific, with a GDP of approximately US$1.6 trillion. Australia's total wealth is 6.4 trillion dollars. In 2011, it was the 13th largest national economy by nominal GDP.  Businesspersons involved in different activities, whether commercial or industrial, for the purpose of generating revenue from a combination of human, financial, and physical capital are listed here.

A 
 Peter Abeles
 Stefan Ackerie
 George Adams
 Rodney Adler
 Ross Adler
 James Ainslie
 Karen Andrews
 Don Argus
 Geoffrey H. Arnott
 Halse Rogers Arnott

B 
 Reg Bartley
 Jean Battersby
 Maggie Beer
 Kevin Bermeister
 James Boag I
 James Boag II
 Shaun Bonett
 Richard Bowker
 Benjamin Boyd
 Andrew Brown
 Walter Bugno
 Peter Bush
 Charles Sinclair Butt
 Rod Butterss

C 
 David James Campbell
 Robert Campbell
 James Cavill
 Michael Chaney
 David Clarke
 David S. Clarke
 Leigh Clifford
 George Coles
 Ian Collins
 John Connor
 Garrie Cooper
 Roger Corbett
 Chris Corrigan
 Owen Cox
 David Crawford
 Simon Currant

D 
 Douglas Daft
 John Davies
 Damien De Bohun
 William Detmold
 Geoff Dixon
 Ian Duffell
 Dick Dusseldorp

E 
 Rick Ellis

F 
 Rick Farley
 John Fletcher
 Andrew Forrest
 Lindsay Fox

G 
 John Gagliardi
 Lyall Gorman
 Peter Gormley
 Ainsley Gotto
 John Grill
 Bruno Grollo

H 
 Simon Hackett
 Walter Russell Hall
 Lang Hancock
 Arthur Hardy
 Wilhelm Harnisch
 Rick Hart
 Gerry Harvey
 David Hill
 Fred Hilmer
 Samuel Hordern
 Sean Howard
 Peter Hurley

I 
 Ronald Irish
 Clive Isenberg
 Peter Ivany

J 
 Kevin Jacobsen
 Neville Jeffress
 Graeme John
 Ian Johnson
 Barry Jones
 Charles Lloyd Jones

K 
 Con Kafataris
 Michael Kailis
 Kevin Kalkhoven
 Ben Keighran
 Steve Killelea
 Grant King
 Wallace King
 David Kingston
 Marius Kloppers
 Ron Knapp
 Ian Knop

L 
 Eve Laron OAM (born 1898), architect
 John Lawes
 John Lazarou
 George Leake
 David Leckie
 Andrew Lindberg
 Paul Little
 Andrew Locke
 Geoff Lord
 James Robinson Love

M 
 Alexander MacRae
 Michael Malouf
 Gary March
 Henry Marcus Clark
 John Marlay
 George McCulloch
 Wayne McDonald
 John McFarlane
 Simon McKeon
 Kevin McQuay
 Rod Menzies
 Glen Milliner
 Rob Moodie
 Allan Moss
 John Mulcahy
 Ken Myer
 Sidney Myer

N 
 Charbel Nader

O
 Trevor O'Hoy

P 
 Kerry Packer
 Clyde Packer
 Clive Palmer
 Rocco Pantaleo
 John Pascoe
 Nev Pask
 William Frederick Pattinson
 Jim Petrich
 Cillín Perera
 Gordon Pickard
 Harvie Picken
 J. T. Picken
 Andrew Plympton
 Nick Politis
 William Porteous
 Ian Potter

R 
 Cathie Reid
 Gina Rinehart
 Bill and Imelda Roche
 Edmund Rouse
 Trevor Rowe
 Mark Rowsthorn
 Peter Rowsthorn

S 
 Graeme Samuel
 George Sargent
 Ines Scotland
 Allan Scott
 John Singleton
 Maha Sinnathamby
 Steven Skala
 David Smorgon
 Graham Smorgon
 Victor Smorgon
 Robert Somervaille
 Malcolm Speed
 Kerry Stokes
 John Story
 Greg Swann
 Rudie Sypkes

T 
 Ken Talbot
 Tan Chin Nam
 Nick Tana
 Scott Taunton
 David Thodey
 Albert Toll
 Tina Tower
 Robert Towns
 Jim Truscott

U 
 James Underwood
 Joseph Underwood

V 
 Roelf Vos

W 
 Henry Waymouth
 Tony Wheeler
 Nicholas Whitlam
 Walter Worboys
 Charles William Wren

Y 
 Arthur Yates
 Edward Lowenstern Yencken
 William Younghusband

Z 
 Shi Zhengrong

See also
 List of Australians by net worth

References

 
Businesspeople
Australian